John William Sullivan (born 7 February 1929) is an Australian former politician.

Sullivan was born in Narrandera, New South Wales and educated at Narranderra High School, St Patrick's College, Goulburn, Royal Military College, Duntroon. He married Mollie O'Sullivan in July 1955 and they had two daughters and two sons.

Sullivan was a representative for the Division of Riverina in New South Wales in the Australian House of Representatives from the 1974 federal election to 1977. He was a member of the National Party of Australia, which was named the Country Party when he joined Parliament and was renamed the National Country Party in the 1975 elections. He narrowly defeated Labor Immigration Minister Al Grassby in the 1974 election, winning by 864 votes, thanks to the help of anti-immigration groups, led by the Immigration Control Association, which targeted Grassby because of his stance on immigration during his time as Minister for Immigration.

He was comfortably reelected in the massive Coalition landslide of 1975. Ahead of the 1977 federal election, a redistribution dramatically altered Riverina. The neighbouring seat of Darling, one of the few safe country seats for Labor, was abolished, and the bulk of its territory, including the Labor stronghold of Broken Hill, was merged into Riverina. Sullivan previously held Riverina with a comfortably safe majority of 11 percent, but the redistribution erased his majority and gave Labor a notional majority of two percent. Even though the Coalition was easily re-elected, Sullivan lost his seat to the former member for Darling, Labor's John FitzPatrick.

He was the Country Party member for Sturt in the New South Wales Legislative Assembly from February to August 1981, winning the 1981 by-election caused by Tim Fischer's resignation to contest the 1980 by-election for the seat of Murray.

References

 

1929 births
Royal Military College, Duntroon graduates
Living people
Members of the Australian House of Representatives
Members of the Australian House of Representatives for Riverina
National Party of Australia members of the Parliament of Australia
Members of the New South Wales Legislative Assembly
National Party of Australia members of the Parliament of New South Wales
20th-century Australian politicians